The 2017 EBSA European Under-21 Snooker Championship was an amateur snooker tournament that is taking place from 8 March to 12 March 2017 in Nicosia, Cyprus.  It is the 21st edition of the EBSA European Under-21 Snooker Championships and also doubles as a qualification event for the World Snooker Tour.

Results

Round 1
Best of 7 frames

References

2017 in snooker
Snooker amateur tournaments
Sport in Nicosia
2017 in Cypriot sport
International sports competitions hosted by Cyprus
EBSA European Under-21 Snooker Championship